Elijah Allsopp (1877 - 1958) was a footballer who played in The Football League for Notts County. He also played for Bury.

References

English footballers
Notts County F.C. players
English Football League players
1877 births
1958 deaths
Bury F.C. players
Association football midfielders
Footballers from Derby